Wilno District was a district of the Civil Administration of the Eastern Lands from June 1919 to September 1920, and Provisional Administration of Front-line and Phase Territories from September 1920 to December 1920, all of which were under the control of the Second Polish Republic. Its seat was located in Vilnius. In December 1919, it had an area of 48,466 km² (18,712.8 square miles), and was inhabited by 1,633,504 people.

It was established on 7 June 1919 from the lands conquered from the Socialist Soviet Republic of Lithuania and Belorussia by Poland. On 17 January 1920, it was incorporated into Provisional Administration of Front-line and Phase Territories. On 20 December 1920, the civil administration was disestablished and the district was divided between Nowogródek District, Second Polish Republic and Lithuania.

History 
It was established on 7 June 1919 with the formation of Civil Administration of the Lands of Volhynia and Podolian Front, from the lands conquered from the Socialist Soviet Republic of Lithuania and Belorussia. It was formed as a district of the civil administration under the control of Second Polish Republic, of the lands conquered by it during the Polish–Soviet War. Its seat was located in Vilnius. The region was governed by the Chief of District.

It consisted of the counties of Wilno, Troki, Oszmiana, Święciany, Lida, Grodno and Nowogródek.

Between July and September 1919 was formed Wilejka County. 31 October 1919, Brasław County was incorporated into the district. On 6 November 1919, Dzisna County was formed, with provisional seat in Hlybokaye.

On 1 August 1919, from the part of Nowogródek County was formed Baranowicze County that was incorporated into Brześć District.

On 9 September 1920, the district was incorporated into, then formed, Provisional Administration of Front-line and Phase Territories. On 20 December 1920, the civil administration was disestablished and lands of the district were divided between Nowogródek District, Second Polish Republic and Lithuania.

Demography 
In December 1919, the district was inhabited by 1,633,504 people, and had an area of 48,466 km² (18,712.8 square miles), having the population density of 33.7 people/km² (87.3 people/square mile). The biggest cities were: Vilnius with 128,954 inhabitants, Grodno with 28,165, and Lida with 11,365 . The territory also included 23,497 other settlements, from which 3 had population between 5 and 10 thousand people, and 48, between 1 and 5 thousand.

Education 
In the school year of 1919/1920, the district had 929 primary schools, 26 middle schools, 13 vocational schools, 4 teacher seminars and 56 courses. To all schools had attended 80,481  students and had taught 2173 teachers. In March 1920, there were 859 schools that taught in Polish language and 968 that taught in others.

Subdivisions

Counties 
Brasław County
Grodno County
Lida County
Oszmiana County
Nowogródek County
Święciany County
Troki County
Wilejka County
Wilno County

Notes

References 

States and territories established in 1919
States and territories disestablished in 1920
1919 establishments in Poland
1920 disestablishments in Poland
Districts of the civil administrations of the Second Polish Republic
Western Belorussia (1918–1939)
History of Vilnius
Wilno Voivodeship (1926–1939)